Meukek is a district in South Aceh Regency in Aceh, Northern Sumatra, Indonesia. Meukek was attacked by the American Navy in January 1839.

List of villages 
 Alue Baro
 Alue Meutuah
 Aron TUnggai
 Blang Bladeh
 Blang Kuala
 Blang Teungoh
 Buket Meuh
 Drien Jalo
 Ie Buboh
 Ie Dingen
 Jambo Papeun
 Keude Meukek
 Kuta Baro
 Kuta Buloh I
 Kuta Buloh II
 Labuhan Tarok I
 Labuhan Tarok II
 Ladang Baro
 Ladang Tuha
 Lhok Aman
 Lhok Mamplam
 Rot Teungoh
 Tanjung Harapan

References 
 Kecamatan Meukek dalam Angka 2015. 2015. Badan Pusat Statistik Aceh Selatan. Banda Aceh

South Aceh Regency